Private Joseph Pantillion Martínez (July 27, 1920 – May 26, 1943) born in Taos, New Mexico, was a United States Army soldier who posthumously received the Medal of Honor — the United States' highest military decoration —- for his actions on the Aleutian Islands during World War II. Private Joseph P. Martínez was the first Hispanic-American and first Coloradan to receive the Medal of Honor during World War II. His posthumous award was the first act for combat heroism on American soil (other than the 15 at Pearl Harbor) since the Indian Wars.

Early years
Joe Martínez, a Mexican-American, was one of seven children born to José Manuel Martínez and María Eduvigen Romo, both who were natives of New Mexico. In 1927, his father, who was an agricultural laborer, decided to move from Taos, New Mexico to Ault, Colorado. There, Martínez received his primary and secondary education. In August 1942, he was drafted into the United States Army and sent to Camp Roberts, California where he received his basic training.

World War II
On June 6, 1942, Japanese forces invaded the island of Kiska and on June 7, the island of Attu. These islands are among the westernmost islands on the Aleutian chain and are part of Alaska. The U.S. feared that the islands would be used as bases from which to launch a full-scale aerial assault against the cities in the United States West Coast, and it became a matter of national pride to expel the first invaders to occupy American soil since the War of 1812.

After Martínez completed his basic training, he was assigned to Company K, 32d Infantry, 7th Infantry Division. On May 11, 1943, the 7th Infantry Division landed at Holtz Bay, Attu, officially starting the Battle of Attu. On May 25, 32nd Infantry Regiment was engaged in combat in the vicinity of Fish Hook Ridge against enemy troops. The regiment was pinned down by enemy machine gun fire and Martinez on his own account led two assaults. He fired his Browning Automatic Rifle (BAR) into the Japanese foxholes, killing five machine gunners, and the men of his unit followed. Martínez was shot in the head as he approached one final foxhole after the second assault, dying of the wound the following day. Martínez was posthumously awarded the Medal of Honor.

Private Martínez was the first Hispanic-American recipient who was posthumously awarded the Medal of Honor for combat heroism on American soil during World War II.

Medal of Honor citation

Honors
Martínez was buried with full military honors at Ault Cemetery, Ault, Weld County in Colorado.  On April 13, 1945, the United States Navy named one of its ships, which served as a troop transport during the Korean War, the USNS Private Joe P. Martinez.  The state of Colorado has honored his memory by naming a street and renaming a former base reception center and early officer's club which currently serves as the service center after him. The government named a Disabled American Veterans chapter in Colorado and an American Legion post in California in his honor. Three statues were erected with his likeness and are located in the Colorado cities of Ault, Greeley at the Weld County Veterans Memorial Park, and Denver.  The U.S. Army also named an Army Reserve military installation in Denver, Colorado after Martinez.
The 7th Infantry Division honored him by naming the Fort Ord Welcome Center (originally the Post Headquarters built in 1941)Martinez Hall in 1977. Although Fort Ord closed in 1993, Martinez Hall still serves as a Veterans Transition Service Center.
The City of Denver has also named a park after Private Martinez, "Joseph P Martinez Park", which is at 900 N Raleigh St, Denver, CO.

Awards and recognitions
Among Private Joe P. Martínez' decorations and medals were the following:

See also

 List of Medal of Honor recipients for World War II
 Hispanic Medal of Honor recipients
 Weld County Veterans Memorial
 Hispanic Americans in World War II

References

External links
 
 
 
 
 
 

1920 births
1943 deaths
United States Army personnel killed in World War II
United States Army Medal of Honor recipients
United States Army soldiers
American people of Mexican descent
World War II recipients of the Medal of Honor
People from Taos, New Mexico